The AN/SPG-62 is a continuous wave fire-control radar developed by the United States, and it is currently deployed on warships equipped with the Aegis Combat System. It provides terminal target illumination for the semi-active SM-2MR/ER and ESSM Block 1 surface-to-air missiles. It also provides illumination for the active SM-6 if it is used in semi-active mode. The antenna is mechanically steered, uses a parabolic reflector, and operates at 8 to 12 GHz (I–J Band). The system is a component of the Mk 99 fire-control system (FCS).

The first units were installed on the cruiser , which was commissioned in 1983. Since then, the SPG-62 has been placed in service with many U.S. and foreign navy ships that have the Aegis Combat System.

The SPG-62's role in Aegis fire control is to illuminate targets in the terminal interception phase. First, the ship's main search radars—either the AN/SPY-1 or the AN/SPY-6—detect and track the target. The Mk 99 FCS then launches surface-to-air missile(s) to intercept. If the interceptor missile uses semi-active radar homing (SM-2 or ESSM Block 1), it will need an external radar to illuminate its target for terminal guidance, which is where the SPG-62 comes into play. The Mk 99 FCS points an SPG-62 toward the target, and it shoots a narrow radar beam that reflects off the target. The interceptor missile's passive receiver homes in on these reflected emissions.

It uses a very narrow beam of radiofrequency (RF) radiation. This accomplishes four things:

 Provides very precise target tracking
 Gives the AN/SPG-62 a high radar resolution, which makes it more effective in determining if there is one contact or multiple contacts
 Enables the AN/SPG-62 to serve as a secondary, rudimentary search radar (in conjunction with the SPY-1 or SPY-6)
 Requires a relatively low level of energy to operate (10 kW peak power on average)
Because illumination is only needed for the last few seconds prior to interception, a ship can have more semi-active SAMs in the air than it has SPG-62s. In the event of a saturation attack, the Aegis Combat System can time-share each AN/SPG-62 to serve multiple semi-active interceptors in the air at once.

Users

References 

Naval radars
Military electronics of the United States
Sea radars
Military radars of the United States